Marvin Delph (born September 15, 1956) is a retired African American basketball player, who experienced his greatest success at the college level.

In high school, Delph led the Conway Wampus Cats to two state basketball championships, in 1973 and 1974.

Known for his outside shooting and remarkable leaping ability, Delph was a member of the University of Arkansas Razorbacks NCAA Final Four team in 1978.  Along with Sidney Moncrief and Ron Brewer, he was labeled as one of the "Triplets", a trio of Arkansas-born, similarly-sized players who led Arkansas basketball through a tremendous resurgence after years of mediocre play.

Following his college career, Delph was drafted twice, first in the 3rd round of the 1978 NBA draft by the Buffalo Braves and then in the 6th round of the 1979 NBA draft by the Boston Celtics.  Unlike his fellow Triplets, Delph never played in the NBA, despite several attempts.  He continued playing amateur basketball with the Athletes in Action team, a religiously-oriented team.

Delph played for the United States men's national basketball team at the 1978 FIBA World Championship, a team composed primarily of Athletes in Action players.

Delph was inducted into the Arkansas Sports Hall of Fame in 1998.

References 

1956 births
Living people
American men's basketball players
Arkansas Razorbacks men's basketball players
Boston Celtics draft picks
Buffalo Braves draft picks
People from Conway, Arkansas
Shooting guards
United States men's national basketball team players
Wyoming Wildcatters players
1978 FIBA World Championship players